Archibald Stuart-Wortley may refer to:

Archibald Stuart-Wortley (politician) (1832-1890), MP for Honiton
Archibald Stuart-Wortley (painter) (1849-1905), British painter

See also
Archibald Stuart (disambiguation)